The 1955 LFF Lyga was the 34th season of the LFF Lyga football competition in Lithuania.  It was contested by 12 teams, and Lima Kaunas won the championship.

League standings

Playoff
Lima Kaunas 3-0 Raudonasis Spalis Kaunas

References
RSSSF

LFF Lyga seasons
1955 in Lithuania
LFF